Olga Solbelli (11 May 1898 – 8 September 1976) was an Italian film actress. She appeared in 81 films between 1939 and 1967. She was born in Verghereto and died in Bologna.

Selected filmography

 The Anonymous Roylott (1936)
 The Former Mattia Pascal (1937)
 Unjustified Absence (1939)
 A Romantic Adventure (1940)
 The Sinner (1940)
 Schoolgirl Diary (1941)
 A Woman Has Fallen (1941)
 Street of the Five Moons (1942)
 Odessa in Flames (1942)
 The Last Wagon (1943)
 The Peddler and the Lady (1943)
 A Living Statue (1943)
 The Innkeeper (1944)
 The Materassi Sisters (1944)
 Romulus and the Sabines (1945)
 Lost in the Dark (1947)
 The Captain's Daughter (1947)
 The Wolf of the Sila (1949)
 Love and Poison (1950)
 The Cliff of Sin (1950)
 The Ungrateful Heart (1951)
 The Lovers of Ravello (1951)
 Tomorrow Is Another Day (1951)
 Nobody's Children (1951)
 The Man in My Life (1952)
 Brothers of Italy (1952)
 La pattuglia dell'Amba Alagi (1953)
 The Steel Rope (1953)
 The Merchant of Venice (1953)
 Theodora, Slave Empress (1954)
 The King's Prisoner (1954)
 The Lovers of Manon Lescaut (1954)
 Orient Express (1954)
 Barrier of the Law (1954)
 The White Angel (1955)
 The Mysteries of Paris (1957)
 Attack of the Moors (1959)
 Mill of the Stone Women (1960)
 Assault on the State Treasure (1967)

References

External links

1898 births
1976 deaths
People from the Province of Forlì-Cesena
Italian film actresses
20th-century Italian actresses